Ballyvolane is a townland and suburb of Cork on the north side of the city, that borders Mayfield, White's Cross, Glenheights and Dublin Hill. The townland of Ballyvolane is in the civil parish of St. Anne's Shandon. Ballyvolane is within the Cork North-Central Dáil constituency.

The two schools in Ballyvolane are St. Aidan's Community Community College and Scoil Oilibhéir, and the local Roman Catholic Church is Saint Oliver's, built in the 1990s. Nearby archaeological sites, protected under the National Monuments Acts, include a number of burnt mounds and fulacht fiadh.

Ballyvolane Shopping Centre is anchored by Dunnes Stores and first opened in 1980.

In June 2012, several households in the area were damaged by flooding.

Notes

Geography of Cork (city)